United States bandy champions are the winners of the annual play-offs following the regular league of the Division I in the American Bandy League, the top league for bandy in the United States. The championship trophy is called the Gunnar Cup, named for Gunnar Fast, a Swedish army captain who introduced bandy to the United States around 1980.

Winners through the years
Winners since 1981. The championship is usually decided in a play-off at the end of the regular season, but some years the league winner has been named champion instead.

References

Champions
Bandy Champions
Bandy,United States,Champions
United States
Bandy